Mattie's Call is an American law-enforcement-initiated public notification system to locate missing elderly, or otherwise disabled persons.

History 
The first version of the Mattie's Call was drafted in 1996. From 1996 to 2009, 127 Mattie's Calls had been triggered.

In 2004, radio stations and local law-enforcement agencies in the Atlanta, Georgia, area broadcast information about the elderly Mattie Moore missing from her home. Moore, a 67-year-old woman who had been diagnosed with Alzheimer's disease, wandered away from her Atlanta home in April 2004 and was found dead 8 months later in a wood a few hundred meters from her home.

Mattie's Call was created by an act of the Georgia General Assembly in 2006. It is named after Mattie Moore.

Description 
Mattie's Call was patterned after the AMBER Alert system created to locate missing, or abducted children. It uses public-service announcements on radio stations, displays on publicly controlled signaling devices and transmissions to law-enforcement agencies in an attempt to locate the missing endangered person.

Mattie's Call is an example of a Silver Alert system to locate missing senior citizens.

See also 

 Amber alert

Further reading 
 (novel)

References

External links 
 Official website

Alzheimer's disease
Government of Atlanta
Emergency communication
Emergency services in the United States
Georgia (U.S. state) law
Public service announcement organizations
Public service announcements of the United States
Missing people organizations
United States elder law